This is a list of museums in Chile.

List 
 Chilean National Museum of Fine Arts
 Museum of Memory and Human Rights
 Centro Cultural Palacio de La Moneda
 Museo Nacional de Bellas Artes (Santiago de Chile)
 Archaeological Museum of La Serena
 Anthropological Museum R. P. Sebastián Englert
 Museo Nacional Aeronáutico y del Espacio
 Palacio Cousiño
 Museo Arqueológico de Santiago
 Museo Campesino de Colima
 Museo de Santiago
 Museo Catedral Metropolitana
 Museo Colonial San Francisco
 Museo Chileno de Arte Precolombino, Santiago
 Chilean National History Museum
 Museo de Arte Contemporáneo Valdivia
 Museo de Arte Contemporáneo (Santiago, Chile)
 Museo Artequin Museo Artequín
 Museo de Ciencia y Tecnología
 Museo Ferroviario
 Museo de la Solidaridad "Salvador Allende"
 Museo Interactivo Mirador
 Museo Mapuche
 Chilean National Museum of Natural History
 Museo Nao Victoria
 Museo Regional de la Araucanía
 La Chascona, Pablo Neruda's house, now a museum
 Museo La Sebastiana (Casa Pablo Neruda)
 Casa de Isla Negra, Isla Negra
 Museo Fuerte Niebla
 Museo de la Exploración Rudolph Amandus Philippi
 Museo Histórico y Antropológico Maurice van de Maele
 Museo de Arte Precolombino
 Open Air Museum Viña del Mar
 R. P. Gustavo Le Paige Archaeological Museum
 Martin Gusinde Anthropological Museum
 Palacio Baburizza

See also 
 List of museums by country

 
Chile
Museums
Chile
Museums